Milan Subotin (born 1984) is a politician in Serbia. He has served in the Assembly of Vojvodina since 2020 as a member of the Serbian Progressive Party.

Private career
Subotin has a master's degree in traffic engineering. He lives in Novi Sad.

Politician
Subotin received the forty-fifth position on the Progressive Party's Aleksandar Vučić — For Our Children electoral list in the 2020 provincial election and was elected when the list won a majority victory with seventy-six out of 120 mandates. In October 2020, he was selected as chair of the assembly committee on culture and public information. He is also a member of the committee on national equality.

References

1984 births
Living people
Politicians from Novi Sad
Members of the Assembly of Vojvodina
Serbian Progressive Party politicians